Hanrahan Lake is a lake in Scott County, in the U.S. state of Minnesota.

Hanrahan Lake was named for Edward Hanrahan, a pioneer who settled there.

References

Lakes of Minnesota
Lakes of Scott County, Minnesota